Abu'l Ashba b. Tammam, Abul Ashba ibn Tammam (died 1361) was a Muslim chemist. He is considered last in the line of Muslim chemists.

References

Alchemists of the medieval Islamic world
1361 deaths
Year of birth missing